This is a list of the number ones of the 1Xtra Chart.

List of 1Xtra Chart number-one singles of the 2000s
List of 1Xtra Chart number-one singles of the 2010s

See also

List of UK R&B Chart number-one singles

External links
The Official 1Xtra Chart at BBC Radio 1
1Xtra Singles Top 40 at the Official Charts Company

1Xtra